Rossmore is an unincorporated community and census-designated place (CDP) in Logan County, West Virginia, United States, along West Virginia Route 44 and Island Creek. Its population was 301 as of the 2010 census.

Geography
Rossmore is in central Logan County and is bordered to the north by Monaville and to the south by Switzer. WV-44, following Island Creek, leads north (downstream)  to Logan, the county seat, and south  to U.S. Route 52 at the headwaters of the creek.

References

Census-designated places in Logan County, West Virginia
Census-designated places in West Virginia